The men's openweight competition at the 2010 Asian Games in Guangzhou, China was held on 16 November 2010 at the Huagong Gymnasium.

Schedule
All times are China Standard Time (UTC+08:00)

Results
Legend
WO — Won by walkover

Main bracket

Repechage

References

Results

External links
Draw

M999
Judo at the Asian Games Men's Openweight